Kinky Island is an island in the Alexander Archipelago of the Alaska Panhandle.

Kinky Island was named in 1925 by the U.S. Coast and Geodetic Survey.

Kinky Island is included in the Sitka Coastal Management Plan as a special management area and designated recreational use area.

References

Islands of Alaska
Islands of Sitka, Alaska
Islands of the Alexander Archipelago
Tongass National Forest